Ceftibuten is a third-generation cephalosporin antibiotic. It is an orally administered agent, with two dosage forms, capsule or oral suspension. It is marketed by Pernix Therapeutics under the trade name Cedax.

Medical uses

Ceftibuten is used to treat acute bacterial exacerbations of chronic bronchitis (ABECB), acute bacterial otitis media, pharyngitis, and tonsilitis. It is also indicated for pneumonia, infections of the urinary tract, enteritis, and gastroenteritis.

Adverse effects
In 3,000 patients, ceftibuten was well tolerated. The most frequent reactions were gastrointestinal and nausea.

Susceptibility
Ceftibuten is active against Haemophilus influenzae, Moraxella catarrhalis, Escherichia coli, Klebsiella pneumoniae, K. oxytoca, Proteus vulgaris, P. mirabilis, P. providence, Salmonella sp., Shigella sp., Enterobacter sp., and Streptococcus sp.

The following represents minimum inhibitory concentration (MIC) susceptibility data for a few clinically significant microorganisms:
 Haemophilus influenzae: 0.015–1.0 μg/ml
 Moraxella catarrhalis: 0.5–4.0  μg/ml
 Streptococcus pneumoniae: 0.5–256 μg/ml

References

External links
Manufacturer's website
Drug information from RxList

Cephalosporin antibiotics
Thiazoles